The Philippines competed at the 1968 Summer Olympics in Mexico City, Mexico. 49 competitors, 45 men and 4 women, took part in 53 events in 10 sports.

Athletics

Men's 100 metres
Rogelio Onofre

Men's 5,000 metres 
Benjamin Silva-Netto

Men's 10,000 metres 
Benjamin Silva-Netto

Men's Marathon 
Benjamin Silva-Netto

Men's 110m Hurdles
Rogelio Onofre

Basketball

The Philippines finished with a win–loss record of 3-6, and placed 13th overall.
Team Roster
Orlando Bauzon
Danny Florencio
Robert Jaworski
Jimmy Mariano
Alfonso Marquez
Rogelio Melencio
Edgardo Ocampo
Adriano Papa, Jr.
Renato Reyes
Alberto Reynoso (c)
Joaquin Rojas
Elias Tolentino
Freddie Webb - Alternate
Roehl Nadurata - Alternate
Head Coach: Carlos Loyzaga

Boxing

Five shooters, all men, represented the Philippines in 1968.

Light flyweight
 Manolo Vicera

Flyweight
 Rodolfo Díaz

Bantamweight
 Dominador Calumarde

Featherweight
 Teogenes Pelegrino

Lightweight
 Rodolfo Arpon

Cycling 

Three cyclists represented the Philippines in 1968.

Sprint
 Roberto Roxas
 Rolando Guaves

1000m time trial
 Rolando Guaves

Individual pursuit
 Benjamin Evangelista

Gymnastics

Ernesto Beren
Norman Henson

Sailing

Shooting

Eight shooters, all men, represented the Philippines in 1968.

25 m pistol
 Paterno Miranda
 Horacio Miranda

50 m pistol
 Antonio Mendoza
 José Agdamag

300 m rifle, three positions
 Adolfo Feliciano
 Bernardo San Juan

50 m rifle, three positions
 Adolfo Feliciano
 Leopoldo Ang

50 m rifle, prone
 Jaime Villafuerte
 Adolfo Feliciano

Swimming

Weightlifting

Wrestling

References

External links
Official Olympic Reports

Nations at the 1968 Summer Olympics
1968
1968 in Philippine sport